RNLB Henry Blogg (ON 840) was the eighteenth lifeboat to be stationed at Cromer in the county of Norfolk.

ON 840 was stationed at Cromer from 1945 until 1966.

History
In 1945 after 10 years service which included busy service through the second world war H F Bailey ON777 was replaced with a new No 1 lifeboat in December 1945 named The Millie Walton (ON 840). This lifeboat had originally been destined for Douglas on the Isle of Man and had only been sent to Cromer for evaluation. Millie Walton was a Watson-class lifeboat but had a new midship steering position which the Cromer crew found much to their liking and so after request from the Cromer crew she remained at Cromer. In 1948 Millie Walton was renamed Henry Blogg in homage to Cromer’s famous lifeboat man Henry Blogg who was the Coxswain. Henry Blogg made his last voyage on the Millie Walton under the new coxswain Henry "Shrimp" Davies on 4 September 1948 at the age of 71. The call was to the rescue of the steam trawler Balmoral and 11 lives were saved. Henry Blogg retired after 53 years service with the service and he was the holder of the most awards by the RNLI.

Notable rescues

Francois Tixier
In heavy seas on 8 July 1948 a French steamer by the name of Francois Tixier Bound from Goole to the French inland port of Rouen, got into difficulties of the north Norfolk coast four miles (6 km) off Sheringham. The steamer was laden with a cargo of coal and in worsening gale she capsized. With the Sheringham lifeboat undergoing a refit at Oulton Broad, Henry Blogg was launched to the steamer's aid and stood by. With the Francois Tixier heavily listing on the port the lifeboat went alongside but the captain and his crew refused to leave the stricken vessel. Despite the attempts by the crew to secure the cargo, it shifted further to port. With their failed attempts to steady the vessel the captain and crew agreed to leave their ship. One crew man jumped into the water and was rescued; another reached the lifeboat by rope passed between the boats. Using a Breeches buoy, eight more of the crew were rescued. After the eleventh crewman was rescued using the breeches buoy the stricken steamer rolled over and began to sink. The last five remaining crew scrambled on to the stern and as the steamer slipped below the waves they scrambled on to a raft and were picked up by the lifeboat shortly after. The sixteen rescued French seaman were landed at Great Yarmouth by the Henry Blogg. In recognition of their efforts Coxswain Henry Davies and his crew were presented with awards by the French government.

Sheringham lifeboat Forester's Centenary
On 31 May 1958 Henry Blogg took part in an unusual rescue when she was called to aid the Sheringham lifeboat Forester's Centenary. This service began with a call at 9.50am to the Sheringham honorary secretary from the Trinity House Superintendent of Great Yarmouth requesting that a sick man be taken off the Dudgeon Light-vessel. At 10.15am the Sheringham lifeboat Forester's Centenary was launched with a doctor on board and she reached the light-vessel by 1.10pm. The doctor went aboard the light-vessel and dispensed a sedative to the sick man and he was then strapped to a stretcher and transferred to the Forester's Centenary. The lifeboat then set off on the return journey to her station. Nine miles north east from home at around 4.40pm the Forester's Centenary was in trouble when her skew gear which drives the lifeboat's oil and water pumps broke down. Henry Blogg was called out and had to take the Sheringham lifeboat in to tow. Both boats arrived back at the Sheringham station at 7.00pm and the sick man was taken to hospital.

Service and rescues

Gallery

References

 

Cromer lifeboats
Watson-class lifeboats